Fantasy Productions Medienvertriebsgesellschaft GmbH (a.k.a. FanPro) is a German publishing company based in Erkrath.

History
The company was founded in 1983 by Ulrich Kiesow, Werner Fuchs and Hans Joachim Alpers to produce small metal miniature figures. When the Droemer Knaur Verlag and the Schmidt Spiel & Freizeit GmbH published Kiesow's role playing game "Das Schwarze Auge", Kiesow organised the editorial work at FanPro. After the bankruptcy of the Schmidt Spiel & Freizeit GmbH in 1997, FanPro published Das Schwarze Auge by itself.

FanPro LLC 
Fantasy Productions translated FASA products into German for years. When FASA closed in 2001, WizKids licensed some of FASA's old tabletop rights went to the principals of Fantasy Productions. Rob Boyle considered making a bid to license Shadowrun, but before he could, Fantasy Productions expressed interest in Shadowrun themselves. Fantasy Productions founder Werner Fuchs invited Boyle to visit him in Germany, and Boyle was soon setting up and running FanPro LLC, a new corporation created by two of the principals of the Fantasy Productions and Boyle himself. They created the new USA subsidiary FanPro LLC to hold the rights to FASA's game lines. FanPro licensed Shadowrun in early 2001, and Boyle took over as Line Editor, and six months later, FanPro licensed Battletech as well and hired Randall Bills to continue with his job as Battletech Line Editor; that made Bills FanPro LLC's second and only other employee. FanPro LLC also began expanding into translations of German RPGs, their first being The Dark Eye (2003), a translation of Germany's top fantasy RPG, Das Schwarze Auge (1984) – which had recently been released in a fourth edition (2002) by the German Fantasy Productions. The Dark Eye, like FanPro's FASA lines, depended on a metaplot, this one advanced through adventures and Fantasy Productions' Aventurische Bote magazine. However, The Dark Eye did not sell well, and was not further supported by FanPro LLC as a result. Degenesis, originally scheduled for late 2006, would have been a second German RPG, but once more FanPro LLC was not able to follow through.

From 2001 to 2005, FanPro LLC released over a dozen original Shadowrun titles and reprinted core titles that FASA had originally released. In 2005, FanPro LLC released Shadowrun, Fourth Edition. Likewise, FanPro LLC continued to release new Classic BattleTech books in English, and in 2006 released Total Warfare, the first in a series of revised full-color books for Classic BattleTech. FanPro GmbH continued to translate these books into German, along with German-only Shadowrun books.

Licenses selling 
Until early in 2007 FanPro was a publisher for fantasy books and various role playing games. The company owned licensing agreements with WizKids to produce the German-language versions of Classic BattleTech, Shadowrun, Pirates of the Spanish Main, and the "Clix" games of Mage Knight and HeroClix.

FanPro's decision to maintain a small staff meant that they could not do their own warehousing and shipping, and so they instead used the fulfilment company Fast Forward Entertainment. When Fast Forward went under, they took with them many earnings they had collected for FanPro's books and had not paid out. Fantasy Productions in Germany were having problems of their own, and as a result, in April 2007 they started divesting themselves of their gaming properties by selling Das Schwarze Auge and soon all the others. Fantasy Productions were helping to support themselves via gaming stock taken from the FanPro LLC warehouses, which meant not only that FanPro LLC wasn't getting support from its German parent in hard times, but in fact FanPro were supporting them. Boyle and Bills tried to buy FanPro LLC from Fantasy Productions and when that did not work out they threatened to leave and implied that they would be bidding for the WizKids licenses, which were just coming up for renewal. WizKids stepped in to mediate; although they were not willing to let Boyle and Bills create a new company, they were willing to give the licenses to InMediaRes. The license for Das Schwarze Auge went to Ulisses Spiele. Since then the company focuses on publishing novels only, although it continued its preexisting novel series for Das Schwarze Auge ; the Shadowrun and BattleTech series ceased publications in 2008, following disagreements between WizKids and Fantasy Productions concerning the German licence for those properties.

References

External links
German website

Book publishing companies of Germany
Companies based in North Rhine-Westphalia
Publishing companies of Germany
Role-playing game publishing companies
Publishing companies established in 1983